Orkljevec is a small settlement in the hills east of Mirna Peč in southeastern Slovenia. The area is part of the historical region of Lower Carniola. The Municipality of Mirna Peč is now included in the Southeast Slovenia Statistical Region.

References

External links
Orkljevec on Geopedia

Populated places in the Municipality of Mirna Peč